Kevanemobius is a genus of insect in family Gryllidae.

Taxonomy
The Orthoptera Species File database lists the following species:
Kevanemobius paulistorum Bolfarini & de Mello, 2012

References

Ground crickets